Civezza (çivèssa in Ligurian) is a comune (municipality) in the Province of Imperia in the Italian region Liguria, located about  southwest of Genoa and about  west of Imperia.

The village is located on the top of a hill, like many others villages of the riviera.

Civezza borders the following municipalities: Cipressa, Dolcedo, Imperia, Pietrabruna, and San Lorenzo al Mare.

The village was founded in the 11th century: a well-known legend says its birth is due to the decision of three noble families (the Riccas, the Dolcas and the Arrigos) to settle here after being exiled from Venice, because of political contrasts with the city's doge. 
Civezza is a medieval village, with five ancient towers built in the 16th century to defend its territory against saracens pirates.
 
The patron saint is Saint Mark the Evangelist, and he is celebrated on April, 25th. The name of the patron saint is also the name of Civezza's main church (San Marco Evangelista). There are also five smaller churches in Civezza: 'san Giovanni', 'san Rocco', 'san Sebastiano', 'san Salvatore' and 'Madonna delle Grazie'.

Weather is warm but windy in all seasons, and rainfalls are rare.

There is a traditional production of olive oil and wine.

Despite the small size of the village, in Civezza there are: a post office, two alimentari shops, two bars, three agritourisms, a supermarket, a restaurant, a pharmacy, an inn. There's also a kindergarten and a primary school. 
At least four times per day a public bus service connects Civezza to the provincial capital Imperia and San Lorenzo al Mare.

Languages spoken are Italian and Ligurian, the last one mainly by the elderly. French is also widely understood.

Demographic evolution

See also
Liguria wine

References

Cities and towns in Liguria